Kayleb Rae Candrilli  is an American poet. They won a 2019 Whiting Award, 2021 Margaret Reid Prize, and were nominated for a 2018 Lambda Literary Award

They graduated from Pennsylvania State University, and University of Alabama.

They were nonfiction editor of the Black Warrior Review.

Works 

 What Runs Over, YesYes Books, 2017. 
 All the Gay Saints, Saturnalia Books, 2020. 
 Water I Won’t Touch, Copper Canyon Press, 2021.

References

External links 
 https://www.krcandrilli.com/

American poets